Women Strike for Peace (WSP, also known as Women for Peace) was a women's peace activist group in the United States. In 1961, nearing the height of the Cold War, around 50,000 women marched in 60 cities around the United States to demonstrate against the testing of nuclear weapons. It was the largest national women's peace protest during the 20th century. Another group action was led by Dagmar Wilson, with about 1,500 women gathering at the foot of the Washington Monument while President John F. Kennedy watched from the White House. The protest helped "push the United States and the Soviet Union into signing a nuclear test-ban treaty two years later". Reflecting the era in which the group's leaders had been raised, between the First-wave feminism and the Second-wave feminism movements, their actions and pleas leaned towards female self-sacrifice rather than towards their own self-interests. However, they pushed the power of a concerned mother to the forefront of American politics, transforming the mother from a "passive victim of war to active fighter for peace".

History

Formation 
Women Strike for Peace was founded by Bella Abzug and Dagmar Wilson in 1961.  The group initially was part of the movement for a ban on nuclear testing and to end the Vietnam war, first demanding a negotiated settlement, and later total United States withdrawal from Southeast Asia. They used many tactics that were different forms of legal pressure that include petitions, demonstrations, letter writing, mass lobbies, and lawsuits and lobbied individual Congressmen with a proxy request from the Congressman's constituents. They also had a few forms of illegal, nonviolent direct action activities that included sit-ins in congressional offices, and statements of complicity with draft resisters aimed at tying up the courts.

Actions 
On November 1, 1961, at the height of the Cold War, about 50,000 women brought together by Women Strike for Peace marched in 60 cities in the United States to demonstrate against nuclear weapons under the slogan "End the Arms Race not the Human Race". It was the largest national women's peace protest of the 20th century. About 1,500 women led by Dagmar Wilson gathered at the foot of the Washington Monument while President John F. Kennedy watched from a window at the White House. The protest helped "push the United States and the Soviet Union into signing a nuclear test-ban treaty two years later". In January 1962, Berkeley Women for Peace had a thousand women attend the California legislative session to oppose civil defense legislation. Affiliate Seattle Women Act for Peace (SWAP) played a significant role in the protests against the Trident submarine base at Bangor, Washington. The women were moved to action by the Soviet resumption of atmospheric nuclear tests, after a three-year moratorium and by the United States' declaration that it would hold its own tests in retaliation. The group consisted mainly of married-with-children middle-class white women. Its early tactics—including marches and street demonstrations were uncommon in the U.S. at that time—in many ways prefigured those of the anti-Vietnam War movement and of Second-wave feminism. The roots of the organization lay in the traditional female culture, the role women played as full-time wives and mothers and its rhetoric in those years drew heavily on traditional images of motherhood. In particular, in protesting atmospheric nuclear testing, they emphasized that Strontium-90 from nuclear fallout was being found in mother's milk and commercially sold cow's milk, presenting their opposition to testing as a motherhood issue, what Katha Pollitt has called "a maternity-based logic for organizing against nuclear testing." As middle-class mothers, they were less vulnerable to the redbaiting that had held in check much radical activity in the United States since the McCarthy Era. The image projected by WSP of respectable middle-class, middle-aged ladies wearing white gloves and flowered hats while picketing the White House and appealing to the Kremlin to save their children and the planet, helped to legitimize a radical critique of the Cold War and U.S militarism.

In 1962, the members of the advance party of Women Strike for Peace met with Gertrude Baer, who at the time was the secretary for the Women's International League for Peace and Freedom (WILPF) in Geneva at the Seventeen-Nation Disarmament Conference. With their sights set on anti-militarism, they allied themselves with four other peace women's organizations: WILPF, Women's Peace Society (WPS, which was founded in 1919 by Fanny Garrison Villard, daughter of the nineteenth century abolitionist William Lloyd Garrison), the Women's Peace Union (WPU), and the National Committee of the Causes and Cure of War (NCCCW).

House Un-American Activities Committee (HUAC) 
Women Strike for Peace played a crucial role in bringing down the House Un-American Activities Committee (HUAC). From the beginning of the Women Strikes for Peace in 1961 the FBI had the group under surveillance due to fear that communism had spread to the mothers of America. Women Strikes for Peace approached the committee hearings differently than those summoned before them. In November 1962 the leaders of the group were subpoenaed by the HUAC. After the subpoenas were distributed to the women, Women Strikes for Peace released the information to the media before the HUAC could issue a press release, as the committee usually used the news media to discredit the organizations subpoenaed. When under question the women used their status as mothers to argue their moral high ground, as mothers arguing for peace were the most loyal Americans. Another strategy that differed from those before them was the use of a large quantity of WSP members to volunteer to testify at the hearings, effectively showing that the group had nothing to hide. Political theorist Jean Bethke Elshtain determined that the Women Strikes for Peace's performance at the HUAC was a success due to the  "deconstructive power of a politics of humor, irony, evasion, and ridicule". The use of motherhood and family as a tool for the attack on the congressional hearings showed the "familial-cold war consensus" would soon crumble.

Post-1960s 
In Los Angeles, in 1965 and 1970, the Women Strike for Peace Movement, headed by Mary Clarke, published a cookbook that Clarke inspired. The cookbooks, Peace de Resistance, were printed by the noted Ward Ritchie at the Anderson, Ritchie & Simon Press. Author Esther Lewin had lived in France for a period of time and was well-versed in French cooking. Lewin included simple recipes for those days when WSP required their efforts and more complicated recipes for the more relaxed days.

WSP remained a significant voice in the peace movement throughout the 1980s and 1990s, speaking out against U.S. intervention in Latin America and the Persian Gulf states. On June 12, 1982, Women Strike for Peace helped organize one million people who demanded an end to the arms race. In 1988, they supported Carolyna Marks in the creation of the Unique Berkeley Peace Wall, as well as similar walls in Oakland, Moscow, Hiroshima, and Israel (a joint Jewish and Palestinian children's Peace Wall). In 1991, they protested the Iraq-Persian Gulf War; afterwards, they urged the American government to lift sanctions on Iraq. In the late 1990s, Women Strike for Peace mainly focused on nuclear disarmament.

Structure

The Women Strike for Peace's structure is characterized by a nonhierarchical, loosely structured "unorganizational" format that gives nearly total autonomy to its local chapters, and uses consensus methods. Some of the local chapters rapidly became very strong groups in their own right. This structure was created due to the red-baiting other women's peace organizations, such as SANE and the Women's International League for Peace and Freedom had experienced

Notable Members 
 Bella Abzug, founder of Women Strike for Peace, founder of National Women's Political Caucus, and U.S. Representative for New York.
 Dagmar Wilson, founding member of Women Strike for Peace and children's book illustrator.
 Alice Herz, founding member of Detroit's WSP. The first activist to self-immolate on American soil in protest of the Vietnam war.

See also
National Women's Political Caucus
Seneca Women's Encampment for a Future of Peace and Justice
 Greenham Common Women's Peace Camp
Counterculture of the 1960s
The Ribbon International
House Un-American Activities Committee
List of women pacifists and peace activists
List of peace activists
 List of anti-war organizations
Canadian Voice of Women for Peace

Citations

Further reading
 Swerdlow, Amy, Women Strike for Peace: Traditional Motherhood and Radical Politics in the 1960s. University of Chicago Press (1993). .
 Alonso, Harriet Hyman, Peace as a Women's Issue: A History of the U.S. Movement for World Peace and Women's Rights. Syracuse University Press (1993). .
 May, Elaine Tyler, Homeward Bound: American Families in the Cold War Era. BasicBooks (1988).

External links
Women Strike for Peace Records, 1961-1996 Collection: DG 115 at the Swarthmore College Peace Collection, official finding aid.
Image of Women Strike for Peace members dressed in black while carrying roses and signs during a march in Los Angeles, California, 1965. Los Angeles Times Photographic Archive (Collection 1429). UCLA Library Special Collections, Charles E. Young Research Library, University of California, Los Angeles.

Peace organizations based in the United States
Women's political advocacy groups in the United States
Organizations established in 1961
Anti-nuclear organizations based in the United States